Klumpke may refer to:

People
Anna Elizabeth Klumpke (1856–1942), American portrait and genre painter
Augusta Déjerine-Klumpke (1859–1927), American-born French physician
Dorothea Klumpke-Roberts (1861–1942), American-born French astronomer
Julia Klumpke (1870–1961), American violinist and composer

Other
Klumpke paralysis (or Klumpke's palsy or Dejerine-Klumpke palsy), brachial plexus palsy named for Augusta Déjerine-Klumpke
Klumpke-Roberts Award, an award for outstanding contributions to public understanding and appreciation of astronomy